"Margaret's Engagement" is an episode from the TV series M*A*S*H. It was the third episode of the fifth season (after "Bug Out" parts 1 and 2) and originally aired September 28, 1976, with a repeat on April 5, 1977. It was written by Gary Markowitz and directed by Alan Alda.

Overview
Major Margaret Houlihan reveals when she comes back from Tokyo that she is now engaged to Lieutenant Colonel Donald Penobscot, a West Point graduate who has swept her off her feet. Frank Burns does not take the news so well; when Margaret shows Frank her engagement ring, indicating that she will not marry him, Frank pretends to congratulate her, but walks out of the mess tent and tears off the doors in fury.

Things get suspicious when Frank begins to laugh at Hawkeye's jokes, and is kind to Radar; however, the worst is yet to come when Frank deliberately stabs Margaret in the O.R. and later attacks her for being engaged to Penobscot. When this incident prompts Margaret to accuse Frank of cowardice, he tries to prove that he's brave as well as regain Margaret's love back by dressing up in a duck hunter camouflaged uniform, armed with an M1 Carbine and grenades, and going A.W.O.L. to capture North Korean enemies; Frank comes back with a captured Korean family, including small children and the family's ox, who Frank suspects are enemy guerrillas (Frank thinks the children are dwarfs).

Colonel Potter has had enough, orders Frank to his office and has Radar free the family and give them some food and extra provisions, which infuriates the paranoid Frank. Frank refuses to relax and, on the verge of having a complete mental breakdown, threatens to kill Hawkeye, B.J. and Potter with his rifle when mentioned that he is heading for a Section Eight. Radar then enters the room to tell Frank that he has a phone call from someone in the States. It turns out to be Frank's mother and he tells her of the 4077 MASH's hatred to him and that Houlihan tricked Frank into falling in love with her. Hawkeye, B.J., Potter and Radar, overhearing the phone call from Potter's office, feel bad for him. Frank's exhaustion finally catches up to him when he falls asleep while on the phone, and Hawkeye and B.J. then carry him back to the Swamp.

In the final moment of the episode, Frank, B.J. and Hawkeye both see Margaret eating at a table in the mess tent and Frank decides to sit there to speak to her. B.J. and Hawkeye also join him. Frank states that he is going to date one of the nurses and Margaret scoffs Frank by saying "Isn't she a little young for you?" But Frank cleverly responds, "I think a little youth would be nice for a change," which leaves Margaret speechless. Margaret leaves and the remaining trio enjoy a laugh together.

External links

M*A*S*H (season 5) episodes
1976 American television episodes
Television episodes directed by Alan Alda